A grid-connected photovoltaic system, or grid-connected PV system is an electricity generating solar PV power system that is connected to the utility grid. A grid-connected PV system consists of solar panels, one or several inverters, a power conditioning unit and grid connection equipment. They range from small residential and commercial rooftop systems to large utility-scale solar power stations. When conditions are right, the grid-connected PV system supplies the excess power, beyond consumption by the connected load, to the utility grid.

Operation

Residential, grid-connected rooftop systems which have a capacity more than 10 kilowatts can meet the load of most consumers. They can feed excess power to the grid where it is consumed by other users. The feedback is done through a meter to monitor power transferred. Photovoltaic wattage may be less than average consumption, in which case the consumer will continue to purchase grid energy, but a lesser amount than previously. If photovoltaic wattage substantially exceeds average consumption, the energy produced by the panels will be much in excess of the demand. In this case, the excess power can yield revenue by selling it to the grid. Depending on their agreement with their local grid energy company, the consumer only needs to pay the cost of electricity consumed less the value of electricity generated. This will be a negative number if more electricity is generated than consumed. Additionally, in some cases, cash incentives are paid from the grid operator to the consumer.

Connection of the photovoltaic power system can be done only through an interconnection agreement between the consumer and the utility company. The agreement details the various safety standards to be followed during the connection.

Features
Electric power from photovoltaic panels must be converted to alternating current by a special power inverter if it is intended for delivery to a power grid. The inverter sits between the solar array and the grid, and may be a large stand-alone unit or may be a collection of small inverters attached to individual solar panels as an AC module. The inverter must monitor grid voltage, waveform, and frequency. The inverter must detect failure of the grid supply, and then, must not supply power to the grid. An inverter connected to a malfunctioning power line will automatically disconnect in accordance with safety rules, which vary by jurisdiction.  The location of the fault current plays a crucial part in deciding whether the protection mechanism of the inverter will kick in, especially for low and medium electricity supply network. A protection system must ensure proper operation for faults external to the inverter on the supply network. The special inverter must also be designed to synchronize its AC frequency with the grid, to ensure the correct integration of the inverter power flow into the grid according to the waveform.

Advantages
 Systems such as Net Metering and Feed-in Tariff which are offered by some system operators, can offset a customers electricity usage costs. In some locations though, grid technologies cannot cope with distributed generation feeding into the grid, so the export of surplus electricity is not possible and that surplus is earthed.
 Grid-connected PV systems are comparatively easier to install as they do not require a battery system.
 Grid interconnection of photovoltaic (PV) power generation systems has the advantage of effective utilization of generated power because there are no storage losses involved.
 A photovoltaic power system is carbon negative over its lifespan, as any energy produced over and above that to build the panel initially offsets the need for burning fossil fuels. Even though the sun doesn't always shine, any installation gives a reasonably predictable average reduction in carbon consumption.

Disadvantages
 Grid-connected PV can cause issues with voltage regulation. The traditional grid operates under the assumption of one-way, or radial, flow. But electricity injected into the grid increases voltage, and can drive levels outside the acceptable bandwidth of ±5%.
 Grid-connected PV can compromise power quality. PV’s intermittent nature means rapid changes in voltage. This not only wears out voltage regulators due to frequent adjusting, but also can result in voltage flicker.
 Connecting to the grid poses many protection-related challenges. In addition to islanding, as mentioned above, too high levels of grid-connected PV result in problems like relay desensitization, nuisance tripping, interference with automatic reclosers, and ferroresonance.

Islanding

Islanding is the condition in which a distributed generator continues to power a location even though power from the electric utility grid is no longer present. Islanding can be dangerous to utility workers, who may not realize that a circuit is still powered, even though there is no power from the electrical grid. For that reason, distributed generators must detect islanding and immediately stop producing power; this is referred to as anti-islanding.

Anti-islanding
In the case of a utility blackout in a grid-connected PV system, the solar panels will continue to deliver power as long as the sun is shining. In this case, the supply line becomes an "island" with power surrounded by a "sea" of unpowered lines. For this reason, solar inverters that are designed to supply power to the grid are generally required to have automatic anti-islanding circuitry in them. In intentional islanding, the generator disconnects from the grid, and forces the distributed generator to power the local circuit. This is often used as a power backup system for buildings that normally sell their power to the grid.

There are two types of anti-islanding control techniques:

 Passive: The voltage and/or the frequency change during the grid failure is measured and a positive feedback loop is employed to push the voltage and/or the frequency further away from its nominal value. Frequency or voltage may not change if the load matches very well with the inverter output or the load has a very high quality factor (reactive to real power ratio). So there exists some Non Detection Zone (NDZ).
 Active: This method employs injecting some error in frequency or voltage. When grid fails, the error accumulates and pushes the voltage and/or frequency beyond the acceptable range.

See also

 Building-integrated photovoltaics
 Distributed generation
 Grid energy storage
 List of rooftop photovoltaic installations
 List of countries by electricity production from renewable sources
 Photovoltaics
 Solar power
 Renewable energy
 Variable renewable energy

References

External links
 Database of State Incentives for Renewables & Efficiency
 Inverter basics (downloadable PDF)

Photovoltaics